Ardooie Castle is a castle in Ardooie, Belgium.

See also
List of castles in Belgium

Castles in Belgium
Castles in West Flanders
Ardooie